This article is a list of diseases of Persian Walnuts (Juglans regia).

Bacterial diseases

Fungal diseases

Nematodes, parasitic

Viral diseases

Miscellaneous diseases and disorders

References 
 Common Names of Diseases, The American Phytopathological Society

+diseases
Persian walnut
Persian walnut